Seo Myung-joon (born 15 June 1992) is a South Korean freestyle skier. He competed in the 2018 Winter Olympics.

References

1992 births
Living people
Freestyle skiers at the 2018 Winter Olympics
South Korean male freestyle skiers
Olympic freestyle skiers of South Korea
Freestyle skiers at the 2011 Asian Winter Games
Freestyle skiers at the 2017 Asian Winter Games
Competitors at the 2015 Winter Universiade